Jay Soto (born 1972) is an American smooth jazz guitarist.

Biography 
At age 5, Soto began studying drums, followed by classical piano at age 7, then guitar at age 12.

In 2004, Soto won the local, district and regional rounds in Guitar Center's Guitarmageddon competition. This lead him to the finals at Eric Clapton's Crossroads Guitar festival in Dallas, Texas where he finished as one of the top guitarists in the nation. Also in 2004, Soto sang "The Star-Spangled Banner" for President George W. Bush  at the Memorial Coliseum in Phoenix, Arizona.

In 2005, Soto released his first album, Long Time Coming, and two years later signed with the smooth jazz label, Nu Groove. His self-produced debut led to his meeting producers Jeff Lorber and Paul Brown, who helped produce Soto's second album, Stay Awhile.

Soto's 2007 single, "Slammin", was listed in the top 5 on Radio and Records's Smooth Jazz Chart.

He has had song placements in HBO's Sex and the City and The Weather Channel and has been featured in JazzTimes and 20th Century Guitar. He has played with Michael Lington, Jeff Lorber, Paul Brown, Marion Meadows, Euge Groove, Jeffrey Osborne, Craig Chaquico, Acoustic Alchemy, and Peter White.

Discography 
 2005 Long Time Coming 
 2007 Stay Awhile 
 2009 Mesmerized
 2013 Morning Glory
 2015 Veritas
 2018 On the Verge

References

External links 
 Official site 
 Smooth Jazz Now Review

1972 births
American jazz guitarists
Living people
Guitarists from Arizona
Smooth jazz guitarists
American male guitarists
21st-century American guitarists
21st-century American male musicians
American male jazz musicians